Timothée Adolphe (born 29 December 1989) is a blind French Paralympic athlete who competes in sprinting events in international level events. He participates in sprinting events with running guides Fadil Bellaabouss, Bruno Naprix and Jeffrey Lami.

In September 2021, he was awarded the Ordre national du Mérite.

References

External links
 
 

1989 births
Living people
Athletes from Paris
Paralympic athletes of France
French male sprinters
Athletes (track and field) at the 2016 Summer Paralympics
Athletes (track and field) at the 2020 Summer Paralympics
Medalists at the 2020 Summer Paralympics
Paralympic medalists in athletics (track and field)
Paralympic silver medalists for France
Knights of the Ordre national du Mérite
20th-century French people
21st-century French people
Visually impaired sprinters
Paralympic sprinters